The Women's EuroHockey Nations Championship is an international women's field hockey competition organized by the European Hockey Federation (EHF) for the top eight European national teams. It is the top division of the EuroHockey Championships. The inaugural tournament took place in 1984. When the tournament is held close to the Summer Olympic games or the Women's Hockey World Cup, the winner of the tournament is awarded a place in those competitions.

Format
The tournament is played in Divisions normally consisting of eight teams. The top division, containing the eight best national teams, is called the EuroHockey Nations Championship, below which there is the EuroHockey Championship II, then the EuroHockey Championship III, then the EuroHockey Championship IV, and so on.

Qualification
National teams qualify for a division based on their performance in the previous competition. Each time the competition is held, it is with each division's previous top two teams promoted (assuming there is a higher division), and its previous bottom two teams demoted (assuming there is a lower division).

Summary
Assuming divisions consisting of the standard 8 teams, the teams are separated into two pools of four teams. In each pool (pool A and B) the teams play one match against each of the other teams in their pool (three in total). The teams then go on to play classification matches based on their relative ranking from these pool matches to determine their final tournament position.

Details
In each pool, A and B, all the teams play each other once, with points awarded as follows:
3 points for a win
1 point for a draw
0 points for a loss

Upon completion of these matches, each team in the pool is ranked according to the number of points each has accumulated. If any teams in the pool have the same rank, then these teams are ranked:
According to the number of matches they won, or else, if equal
According to respective goal difference ('goals for' less 'goals against'), or else
According to 'goals for', or else
If only two teams are involved, according to the result of the match played between those teams, or else
According to the results of a penalty stroke competition between those teams, or else
This procedure is repeated using the penalty stroke result until the teams can be ranked

Once the relative ranking of the teams in pools A and B is settled, the semi-finals proceed with two games as follows:
Second Pool A v First Pool B
First Pool A v Second Pool B

The winners of these matches then play a match against each other for 1st and 2nd places (the final) and the losing teams play a match against each other for 3rd and 4th places (Bronze medal match).

The third and fourth placed teams in each pool are placed in Pool C (the Relegation Pool) in order to determine fifth to eighth places. Each team plays one match against the two teams that they did not previously play. The results from those games and from the game that was previously played against the other team in their original pool are used to rank each team according to the ranking procedure used in Pool A and B.

Dates
The senior (men's and women's) Nations tournaments are held over seven to eight consecutive days (including rest days) some time during the last two weeks of July and the first four weeks of August every odd numbered year (2009, 2011, etc.).

Summaries

Top four statistics

* = host

Team appearances

See also
EuroHockey Nations Championship
Women's EuroHockey Championship II
Women's EuroHockey Indoor Championship
Women's EuroHockey Junior Championship

Notes

References

 
 
EuroHockey Nations Championship Women
EuroHockey Nations Championship Women